Chemax Municipality (in the Yucatec Maya Language: “monkey's tree”) is one of the 106 municipalities in the Mexican state of Yucatán containing  1,098.6 km2 of land and located roughly 185 km east of the city of Mérida.

History
There is no accurate data on when the town was founded, though it existed before the conquest as part of the province of Cupules. At colonization, Chemax became part of the encomienda system with the first encomendero noted in 1549 as Juan López de Mena.

Yucatán declared its independence from the Spanish Crown in 1821 and during the Caste War of Yucatán the city was abandoned but repopulated after federal troops regained possession of it.  In 1865, the area was assigned to the partition of Valladolid Municipality. In 1918, it was designated as its own municipality.

Governance
The municipal president is elected for a three-year term. The town council has nine councilpersons, who serve as Secretary and councilors of public works, public lighting, police commissaries, public security, public monuments, nomenclature, ecology, and public sanitation.

Communities
The head of the municipality is Chemax, Yucatán. There are 170 populated areas of the municipality with the most important locations being: Además, Catzim, Chemax, Chen, Cocoyol, Kuxeb, Lolbé, Mucel, Punta Laguna, San Juan, San Pedro, Santa Cruz, Santa Elena, Sisbichén, Uspibil, Xalaú, X-Can, X-mab, X-maben, Xochmil, X-tejas and Xuneb. The significant populations are shown below:

Local festivals

From 10 to 13 June, festival in honor of San Antonio de Padua, patron saint of the town of Chemax.

Tourist attractions
 Churches of San Antonio de Padua, built in the sixteenth century
 Church of La Purísima Concepción, built in the seventeenth century
 Church of San Pedro, built in the seventeenth century
 Archaeological sites at Bolmay, Palaban, Petul, Poxil, Sotpol, Tamba, Xalau, Xcan, Xcoom, Xmaos and Xuyap
 Cenotes at Abli, Aktun Eek, Aktun Teel, Aktun Uspibil and Alamo I

Climate
Considered a tropical savanna climate typically with a pronounced dry season.  The Köppen Climate Classification subtype for this climate is Aw (Tropical Savanna Climate).

References 

Municipalities of Yucatán